TNT is an open source instant messaging client which is designed to use AIM and uses the AOL TOC protocol. The client is run within Emacs or XEmacs and is written in Emacs Lisp.

The client was originally written fpr AOL, but the project was abandoned around 1999, along with its other TOC clients, TiK and  TAC.  Since then, independent developers have continued to add features and make new releases.

TNT has been revised to work with the TOC2 protocol.

See also 

Comparison of cross-platform instant messaging clients

External links 
TNT independent development project site

Instant messaging clients
AIM (software) clients
Unix instant messaging clients
Instant messaging clients for Linux
Windows instant messaging clients
MacOS instant messaging clients
Cross-platform software